The rank of admiral of the fleet or fleet admiral was the highest naval rank of the Soviet Union from 1940 to 1955 and second-highest from 1962 to 1991.

It was first created by a Decree of the Presidium of the Supreme Soviet in 1940 as an equivalent to general of the army, but was not used until 1944, when Ivan Isakov and Nikolai Kuznetsov were promoted to the rank.

The rank was abolished on 3 March 1955 with the creation of the rank of admiral of the fleet of the Soviet Union. It was restored in 1962 as the second-highest navy rank.

The rank has been retained by the Russian Federation after 1991.

Insignia
The first insignia was only sleeve insignia. In February 1943, traditional Russian ranks were reintroduced and the sleeve insignia was changed and shoulder straps were added with four "Nakhimov stars". In 1945, the stars was were replaced with a single, bigger star to look similar to marshal's shoulder boards.

Officers promoted to admiral of the fleet

See also
Ranks and rank insignia of the Soviet Army 1943–1955, and ... 1955–1991
 Army General (Soviet rank)
 Admiral of the fleet (Russia)
 Admiral of the fleet

Notes

References

 

Soviet admirals
Admirals
Military ranks of the Soviet Union
Soviet Navy